Deunte Raymon Heath (born August 28, 1985) is an American professional baseball pitcher for the Acereros de Monclova of the Mexican League. He made his Major League Baseball (MLB) debut on September 1, 2012, for the Chicago White Sox, and has also pitched in Nippon Professional Baseball (NPB) for the Hiroshima Toyo Carp and Saitama Seibu Lions.

Early life
Heath went to Newton County High School and was drafted in the 27th round, 799th overall, as a senior by the New York Mets in 2003. He did not sign, and went on to Lake City Community College. In his freshman year of 2004, he got 6 wins and was named Second-Team All-Mid Florida Conference. He was drafted that year by the Tampa Bay Devil Rays in the 25th round, 735th overall, 13 selections before Rays outfielder Justin Ruggiano. However, he did not sign and returned to Lake City CC. In his sophomore year, he got 4 wins and was rated as the 146th best prospect for the 2005 MLB Draft by Baseball America. In that draft, he was selected by the Los Angeles Angels of Anaheim in the 23rd round, 703rd overall, 2 selections before Phillies pitcher David Herndon. Once again, Heath did not sign, but he did transfer to the University of Tennessee. In his junior year, he went 4-3 with a 3.86 ERA.

Professional career

Atlanta Braves
He was drafted in the 2006 Draft by the Atlanta Braves in the 19th round, 580th overall, 1 selection before Indians pitcher Josh Tomlin.

Heath was assigned to Single-A Rome, where he went 2-3 with a 2.03 ERA before being promoted to High-A Myrtle Beach, where he went 2-4 with a 5.82 ERA. He started 2007 with Myrtle Beach, where he went an impressive 9-2 with a 3.11 ERA before being promoted to Double-A Mississippi, where he went 4-5 with a 5.56 ERA. He started 2008 with Mississippi, going 2-5 with a 4.16 ERA before being promoted to Triple-A Gwinnett, where he went 0-1 with a 9.64 ERA. Heath was released after the year. He played the offseason in the Arizona Fall League with Mesa, appearing in 10 games with an 8.31 ERA.

Chicago White Sox
Heath signed with the White Sox on April 4, 2010. He played 2010 with Double-A Birmingham, going 2-4 with a 3.12 ERA exclusively in relief. He played all of 2011 with Triple-A Charlotte, where he went 4-7 with a 4.73 ERA. He was added to the 40-man roster to be protected from the Rule V Draft.

On July 4, 2012, Heath was called up by the White Sox to replace the injured Jesse Crain.  He was returned to Charlotte on July 8, without having made an appearance for the White Sox. Heath was outrighted off the White Sox roster on February 7, 2014.

Mexican League
On April 18, 2016, Heath signed with the Vaqueros Laguna of the Mexican Baseball League. On May 17, 2016, Heath was traded to the Pericos de Puebla. He served as the team's closer for the 2016 and 2017 seasons before being released following the 2017 season.

Toyama Thunderbirds
On March 9, 2018, Heath signed with the Toyama Thunderbirds of the independent Baseball Challenge League of Japan.

Saitama Seibu Lions
On May 10, 2018, Heath was traded to the Saitama Seibu Lions of Nippon Professional Baseball (NPB).

On November 13, 2019, Heath placed on waivers. On November 20, 2019, he become free agent.

Mexican League (second stint)
On May 12, 2022, Heath signed with the Acereros de Monclova of the Mexican League.

References

External links

, or NPB

1985 births
Living people
Acereros de Monclova players
African-American baseball players
American expatriate baseball players in Japan
American expatriate baseball players in Mexico
Baseball players from Atlanta
Birmingham Barons players
Charlotte Knights players
Chicago White Sox players
Gwinnett Braves players
Hiroshima Toyo Carp players
Leones del Caracas players
American expatriate baseball players in Venezuela
Major League Baseball pitchers
Mesa Solar Sox players
Mexican League baseball pitchers
Mississippi Braves players
Myrtle Beach Pelicans players
Naranjeros de Hermosillo players
Nippon Professional Baseball pitchers
Pericos de Puebla players
Rome Braves players
Saitama Seibu Lions players
Tennessee Volunteers baseball players
Tigres de Aragua players
Vaqueros Laguna players